Akeem Jordan (born 18 October 1994) is a West Indian cricketer. He made his List A debut for Combined Campuses and Colleges in the 2018–19 Regional Super50 tournament on 4 October 2018. In the semi-final of the tournament, he took a five-wicket haul against Trinidad and Tobago to help Combined Campuses and Colleges progress to the final.

He made his Twenty20 debut on 15 September 2019, for the St Kitts & Nevis Patriots, in the 2019 Caribbean Premier League. The following month, he was named in the Combined Campuses' squad for the 2019–20 Regional Super50 tournament. He was the leading wicket-taker for Combined Campuses and Colleges in the tournament, with 16 dismissals in eight matches.

He made his first-class debut on 18 May 2022, for Barbados in the 2021–22 West Indies Championship.

International career
In February 2023, Jordan was selected in West Indies Test squad for the South Africa series.

References

External links
 

1994 births
Living people
Barbados cricketers
Combined Campuses and Colleges cricketers
Place of birth missing (living people)
St Kitts and Nevis Patriots cricketers